Marco "Marc" Silcock (born 4 November 1988) is an English former actor, best known for his portrayal of Jackson Walsh in the British soap opera Emmerdale.

Career
Silcock studied acting at City College Manchester and has a Diploma in Performing Arts.

Silcock joined the cast of Emmerdale as Josh Hope in 2001. He played the role of Eli in Hollyoaks from 2008 to 2009. Silcock also played Anthony Sugden in Waterloo Road, Fergal Maguire in Shameless and a hotel desk boy in The Innocence Project. He took part in the mini-series Privates as Lance Corporal Jimmy Hobbs.

In March 2010, it was announced that Silcock had rejoined the cast of Emmerdale, this time as Jackson Walsh, a potential love interest for Aaron Dingle (Danny Miller). Silcock filmed his final scenes for the show on 14 May 2011. He described his character's exit as "memorable", but refused to comment on how he would leave the soap.
In 2017, Silcock retired from acting and became an estate agent with Kamani Property Group. His former co-star Adam Thomas also joined the property empire in 2018.

Awards and nominations

Note: At the 2011 British Soap Awards, the train crash, (which involved Silcock's character) was nominated for Spectacular Scene of the Year. This nomination went to the director, Duncan Foster. At the 2012 British Soap Awards Jackson's Choice won Best Storyline, Mark Silcock accepted the award on behalf of Emmerdale, however the award is in fact credited to the Emmerdale Production Team.

References

External links

1988 births
Living people
English male soap opera actors